The 2016 Boise State Broncos football team represented Boise State University during the 2016 NCAA Division I FBS football season. It marked the Broncos' 80th season overall, sixth as a member of the Mountain West Conference and fourth within the Mountain Division. They played their home games at Albertsons Stadium in Boise, Idaho. They were led by third-year head coach Bryan Harsin. They finished the season 10–3, 6–2 in Mountain West play to finish in a three-way tie for the Mountain Division title. After tiebreakers, they did not represent the Mountain Division in the Mountain West Championship Game. They were invited to the Cactus Bowl where they lost to Baylor.

This season marked the 30th anniversary season that the Broncos have played on the Blue Turf.

Preseason

Award watch lists
Listed in the order that they were released.

Maxwell Award – So. QB Brett Rypien & Jr. RB Jeremy McNichols

Mackey Award – Jr. TE Jake Roh

Lou Groza Award – Sr. K Tyler Rausa

Bronko Nagurski Trophy – Sr. LB Tanner Vallejo

Butkus Award – Sr. LB Tanner Vallejo

Fred Biletnikoff Award – Sr. WR Thomas Sperbeck

Davey O'Brien Award – So. QB Brett Rypien

Doak Walker Award – Jr. RB Jeremy McNichols

Walter Camp Award – So. QB Brett Rypien

Mountain West media days
At the Mountain West media days, held at the Cosmopolitan in Las Vegas, Nevada, the Broncos were picked as the overwhelming favorites to win the Mountain Division title, receiving 27 of a possible 29 first place votes. So. QB Brett Rypien, Sr. WR Thomas Sperbeck and Sr. K Tyler Rausa were selected to the all-conference first team.

Media poll

Mountain Division
 Boise State – 172 (27)
 Air Force – 126 (2)
 Utah State – 95
 Colorado State – 95
 New Mexico – 74
 Wyoming – 31

Schedule

Schedule Source:

Game summaries

at Louisiana–Lafayette

 Passing leaders: Brett Rypien (BSU): 22–33, 347 YDS, 2 TD; Anthony Jennings (ULL): 21–33, 186 YDS, 1 TD.
 Rushing leaders: Alexander Mattison (BSU): 11 CAR, 61 YDS, 1 TD; Elijah McGuire (ULL): 14 CAR, 46 YDS.
 Receiving leaders: Thomas Sperbeck (BSU): 6 REC, 130 YDS, 1 TD; Ja'Marcus Bradley (ULL): 3 REC, 50 YDS.

Washington State

 Passing leaders: Brett Rypien (BSU): 19–35, 299 YDS, 1 TD, 3 INT; Luke Falk (WSU): 55–71, 480 YDS, 4 TD, 1 INT.
 Rushing leaders: Jeremy McNichols (BSU): 22 CAR, 116 YDS, 2 TD; Jamal Morrow (WSU): 8 CAR, 22 YDS.
 Receiving leaders: Thomas Sperbeck (BSU): 7 REC, 133 YDS, 1 TD; Tavares Martin Jr. (WSU): 12 REC, 158 YDS, 1 TD.

at Oregon State

 Passing leaders: Brett Rypien (BSU): 19–36, 215 YDS, 1 TD; Conor Blount (OSU): 11–18, 138 YDS.
 Rushing leaders: Jeremy McNichols (BSU): 28 CAR, 208 YDS, 3 TD; Ryan Nall (OSU): 14 CAR, 66 YDS, 2 TD.
 Receiving leaders: Thomas Sperbeck (BSU): 6 REC, 104 YDS; Seth Collins (OSU): 9 REC, 106 YDS.

Utah State

 Passing leaders: Brett Rypien (BSU): 15–24, 163 YDS, 2 TD; Kent Myers (USU): 29–50, 287 YDS, 1 TD.
 Rushing leaders: Jeremy McNichols (BSU): 30 CAR, 132 YDS; Kent Myers (USU): 12 CAR, 47 YDS.
 Receiving leaders: Jeremy McNichols (BSU): 6 REC, 73 YDS, 1 TD; Andrew Rodriguez (USU): 6 REC, 89 YDS, 1 TD.

at New Mexico

 Passing leaders: Brett Rypien (BSU): 21–28, 391 YDS, 5 TD; Lamar Jordan (UNM): 4–14, 39 YDS, 1 TD, 1 INT.
 Rushing leaders: Jeremy McNichols (BSU): 21 CAR, 54 YDS, 2 TD; Lamar Jordan (UNM): 21 CAR, 139 YDS.
 Receiving leaders: Thomas Sperbeck (BSU): 9 REC, 198 YDS, 2 TD; Matt Quarells (UNM): 1 REC, 13 YDS.

Colorado State

 Passing leaders: Brett Rypien (BSU): 16–24, 207 YDS, 1 TD; Nick Stevens (CSU): 17–31, 184 YDS, 2 TD.
 Rushing leaders: Jeremy McNichols (BSU): , 217 YDS, 2 TD; Dalyn Dawkins (CSU): 14 CAR, 66 YDS.
 Receiving leaders: Thomas Sperbeck (BSU): 5 REC, 72 YDS, 1 TD; Michael Gallup (CSU): 4 REC, 91 YDS, 1 TD.

BYU

 Passing leaders: Brett Rypien (BSU): 25–39, 442 YDS, 3 TD, 2 INT; Taysom Hill (BYU): 21–42, 187 YDS.
 Rushing leaders: Jeremy McNichols (BSU): 30 CAR, 140 YDS, 1 TD; Squally Canada (BYU): 21 CAR, 88 YDS.
 Receiving leaders: Jeremy McNichols (BSU): 5 REC, 109 YDS, 1 TD and Tyler Sperbeck 9 REC, 109 YDS, 1 TD; Mitchell Juergens (BYU): 4 REC, 57 YDS.

at Wyoming 

 Passing leaders: Brett Rypien (BSU): 22–35, 295 YDS, 1 INT; Josh Allen (WYO): 18–31, 274 YDS, 3 TD, 1 INT.
 Rushing leaders: Jeremy McNichols (BSU): 18 CAR, 143 YDS, 2 TD; Brian Hill (WYO): 28 CAR, 146 YDS.
 Receiving leaders: Cedrick Wilson Jr. (BSU): 4 REC, 84 YDS; Jacob Hollister (WYO): 6 REC, 144 YDS, 2 TD.

San Jose State

 Passing leaders: Brett Rypien (BSU): 16–21, 219 YDS, 3 TD; Kenny Potter (SJSU): 23–36, 278 YDS, 2 TD, 1 INT.
 Rushing leaders: Jeremy McNichols (BSU): 28 CAR, 158 YDS, 2 TD; Malik Roberson (SJSU): 12 CAR, 109 YDS, 1 TD.
 Receiving leaders: Cedrick Wilson (BSU): 6 REC, 102 YDS, 2 TD; Justin Holmes (SJSU): 6 REC, 106 YDS, 1 TD.

at Hawaii 

 Passing leaders: Brett Rypien (BSU): 18–22, 338 YDS, 4 TD; Dru Brown (UH): 16–31, 125 YDS, 1 TD.
 Rushing leaders: Jeremy McNichols (BSU): 16 CAR, 153 YDS, 2 TD; Paul Harris (UH): 14 CAR, 145 YDS.
 Receiving leaders: Cedrick Wilson (BSU): 7 REC, 141 YDS, 1 TD; Dakota Torres (UH): 3 REC, 35 YDS.

UNLV

 Passing leaders: Brett Rypien (BSU): 10–20, 109 YDS; Kurt Palandech (UNLV): 10–20, 113 YDS, 1 TD.
 Rushing leaders: Jeremy McNichols (BSU): 31 CAR, 206 YDS, 4 TD; Kurt Palandech (UNLV): 9 CAR, 64 YDS, 2 TD.
 Receiving leaders: Thomas Sperbeck (BSU): 5 REC, 47 YDS; Andrew Price (UNLV): 3 REC, 65 YDS, 1 TD.

at Air Force

 Passing leaders: Brett Rypien (BSU): 9–26, 316 YDS, 1 TD; Arion Worthman (AF): 3–5, 45 YDS.
 Rushing leaders: Jeremy McNichols (BSU): 22 CAR, 88 YDS, 1 TD; Arion Worthman (AF): 26 CAR, 80 YDS.
 Receiving leaders: Cedrick Wilson (BSU): 4 REC, 193 YDS, 1 TD; Jalen Robinette (AF): 3 REC, 45 YDS.

Air Force became the first team to beat Boise State for three consecutive season since Nevada in 1996–98.

Baylor–Cactus Bowl

 Passing leaders: Brett Rypien (BSU): 32–51, 305 YDS, 1 TD, 2 INT; Zach Smith (BAY): 28–39, 375 YDS, 3 TD, 1 INT.
 Rushing leaders: Jeremy McNichols (BSU): 19 CAR, 46 YDS; Terence Williams (BAY): 25 CAR, 103 YDS.
 Receiving leaders: Cedrick Wilson (BSU): 6 REC, 88 YDS, 1 TD; K. D. Cannon (BAY): 14 REC, 226 YDS, 2 TD.

Rankings

Scores by quarter
All opponents

Mountain West opponents

Post-season awards

Mountain West first team
Offense

Brett Rypien – So. QB

Thomas Sperbeck – Sr. WR

Travis Averill – Sr. OL

Mario Yakoo – Sr. OL

Defense

Sam McCaskill – Sr. DL

David Moa – So. DL

Mountain West second team
Offense

Jeremy McNichols – Jr. RB

Defense

Ben Weaver – Sr. LB

Chanceller James – Sr. DB

Jonathan Moxey – Sr. DB

Sean Wale – Sr. P

Mountain West honorable mention

Steven Baggett – Sr. OL

Mason Hampton – Jr. OL

Tanner Vallejo – Sr. LB

Cedrick Wilson Jr. – Jr. WR

Award Reference:

Coaching staff

Roster

References

Boise State
Boise State Broncos football seasons
Boise State Broncos football